Hathimudha is a village development committee in Morang District in the Kosi Zone of south-eastern Nepal. At the time of the 1991 Nepal census, it had a population of 6190 people living in 1186 individual households.

References

Village development committees in Morang District
Budhiganga Rural Municipality